Nenad Cvetković (born 23 December 1948) is a Serbian former football manager and player.

Playing career
Cvetković started out at Radnički Niš, making his debut in the 1966–67 Yugoslav First League. He scored 58 goals in 162 appearances over his six seasons with the club, before transferring to Partizan in 1972.

Managerial career
Cvetković served as manager of Radnički Niš on two occasions in the 1990s. He also worked in Gabon, Kuwait, Bahrain, and Cyprus.

References

External links
 

1948 births
Living people
Sportspeople from Niš
Yugoslav footballers
Serbian footballers
Association football forwards
FK Radnički Niš players
FK Partizan players
Yugoslav First League players
Yugoslav football managers
Serbia and Montenegro football managers
Serbian football managers
FK Radnički Niš managers
Serbia and Montenegro expatriate football managers
Expatriate football managers in Gabon
Expatriate football managers in Kuwait
Expatriate football managers in Bahrain
Expatriate football managers in Cyprus
Serbia and Montenegro expatriate sportspeople in Cyprus